The Sea Within are an international rock supergroup founded in 2017, formed by Swedish guitarist and singer-songwriter Roine Stolt, bassist Jonas Reingold and guitarist Daniel Gildenlöw, German drummer Marco Minnemann, and American keyboardist Tom Brislin. Their self-titled debut album was released on 22 June 2018.

History

The beginning
The band's formation was first announced in December 2017. Stolt recalled that the German-based independent record label Inside Out Music first suggested the idea of establishing a new band with strong songwriters. By the time of their announcement, their debut album was nearing completion. The group had gathered in north London to record at Livingston Studios which marked the first time the five had been in the same room together. Stolt realised such a risk would affect the music, but the experience turned into a successful and productive one after almost two hours of music was developed collectively and recorded. Stolt said their direction includes elements of progressive and art rock combined with pop and cinematic music. 

Their self-titled debut album, featuring guest performances from keyboardist Jordan Rudess, singers Jon Anderson and Casey McPherson, and saxophonist Rob Townsend was released on 22 June 2018.  The release was followed by their debut live gig at the Night of the Prog XIII festival in Lorelei, Germany, on 14 July 2018 as well as two gigs on the 2019 Cruise To The Edge.

The absence of Daniel Gildenlöw
In the live concerts he will then be replaced by Casey McPherson, who from bassist, will move to the role of lead guitarist, being replaced momentarily by Pete Trewavas, of Marillion, for only two concerts, and definitively by Jonas Reingold.

Band members

Current members
Roine Stolt – guitar, vocals, keyboards
Jonas Reingold – bass
Marco Minnemann – drums, percussion, vocals, guitar
Tom Brislin – keyboards, vocals
Daniel Gildenlöw – vocals, guitar

Guest members
Casey McPherson – vocals, guitar
Jordan Rudess - keyboards, piano

Discography

References

External links

Musical quintets
Musical groups established in 2017
Progressive rock groups
Rock music supergroups
Inside Out Music artists